LuLu Group International is an Indian Emirati-based multinational conglomerate company that operates a chain of hypermarkets and retail companies, headquartered in Abu Dhabi, United Arab Emirates. It was founded in 2000 by M. A. Yusuff Ali from Nattika, Thrissur district in Kerala, India. LuLu Group International mainly operates the international chain of hypermarkets named "Lulu Hypermarket". LuLu has over 57,000 employees of various nationalities.

It is one of the largest retail chains in Asia and is the biggest in the Middle East with 215 outlets in the Gulf Cooperation Council (GCC) countries and elsewhere. LuLu Group International administrates Lulu Hypermarket which also have 13 malls all over the GCC Countries, and 3 malls in India. Research firm Deloitte, recently placed it amongst the world's 50 fastest growing retailers. Lulu's project of Lulu Bolgatty International Convention Centre in Mulavukada Island Kerala is one of the largest convention centres in South Asia along with the third largest Hyatt branded hotel in the same campus. In 2016, M. A. Yusuff Ali, founder of Lulu, purchased the Scotland Yard Building in London. As of 2013, Yusuff Ali holds a 9.37% share in Cochin International Airport. Lulu Group International has bought a 10-percent stake in the UK-based trading firm, East India Company, and a 40-percent stake in its fine foods subsidiary for around $85 million in total. Y International is the export distribution center in the United States and Europe for LuLu Group International.

History
LuLu Group International opened its first supermarket in Abu Dhabi, United Arab Emirates, in 1995, when the retail business scenario in the region started to change with the entry of Continent (now Carrefour). Later, more LuLu Supermarket stores were opened in different parts of Abu Dhabi. There are also several Lulu stores found in the emirate of Dubai. In the late 1990s, the LuLu Center department stores were launched, and the group expanded to other countries in the Middle East.

In 2000, the first Lulu Hypermarket store was opened in Dubai. With this launch, the Group embarked on an aggressive expansion plan. It soon grew into a chain with several outlets across the UAE, Kuwait, Qatar, Saudi Arabia, Bahrain, Oman, and Yemen. On March 10, 2013, LuLu Hypermarket was opened in Kochi, India. LuLu group also plans to invest Rs 1,000 crore to set up an international convention centre, a five-star hotel and a mall in Lucknow, Uttar Pradesh. They opened the doors of their new Lulu Mall in Thiruvananthapuram to the public in December 2021.It is their biggest mall in Asia. It was inaugurated by the Chief Minister of Kerala Pinarayi Vijayan along with other personalities including actor Mammootty.

Operations

Middle East and India 
As of July 2022, there are more than 200 LuLu Hypermarkets in the GCC, 4 in India at Trivandrum, Kochi, Bangalore and Lucknow, 1 in Malaysia and 4 in Indonesia. Lulu group has 6 other operations in India, the LuLu Cyber Tower in Kochi, Kerala, LuLu fashion center in Thrissur, 2 Marriott Hotels and resorts in Kochi and LuLu convention centre in Thrissur.
Lulu group is heavily investing in Bengaluru, Chennai, Bhubaneswar, Hyderabad, Visakhapatnam, Lucknow, Calicut and Trivandrum.
The group has started construction of new malls in Calicut, Kottayam, and Varanasi. The retail giant is also expected to open its flagship hypermarket in Palakkad by 2024.
The group has also planned to construct malls in multiple cities like Chennai, Hyderabad, Ahmedabad and Prayagraj.
The LuLu group is also setting up a food processing unit in Greater Noida.

International
In April 2013, LuLu Group launched its United Kingdom operations in Birmingham with the inauguration of logistics and packaging facility under the name, Y International. The facility procures and exports food, non-food, chilled and frozen products of British origin to LuLu Hypermarkets spread across the Gulf countries. Date coding and labelling for different countries, translation of labels, Halal and other relevant certifications are also carried out here. About 60 British nationals are employed at the facility which hopes to create 200 jobs soon. In May 2014, following the visit of then Prime Minister Najib Razak to United Arab Emirates, a memorandum of understanding between Lulu Hypermarket and the Federal Land Development Authority (FELDA) was signed for the establishment of ten Lulu Hypermarkets in Malaysia.

Locations

Ownership
Lulu Hypermarket is owned by LuLu Group International. LuLu Group International also owns Twenty14 Holdings, which owns hotels across the world.

See also

 List of hypermarkets
 List of supermarket chains in the United Arab Emirates
 Lulu Mall
 Lulu International Exchange

References

External links
 
 EMKE Group

2000 establishments in the United Arab Emirates
Retail companies established in 2000
Companies based in Abu Dhabi
Supermarkets of the United Arab Emirates
Emirati brands
Multinational companies headquartered in the United Arab Emirates